Tasmate is the name of several places in Vanuatu.

Etymology
The term Tasmate means etymologically "dead sea" (from Proto-Oceanic *tasik 'sea', *mate 'dead'); it refers to places on the coast where the sea is quieter, and makes landing easier.

In the Proto-Torres–Banks language, ancestral to Mota and Mwerlap, it can be reconstructed as *tasimate.

Geography
The name may refer to the following entities:
 Tasmate (Santo), a village on the west coast of Espiritu Santo  []
 Tasmate language, the language spoken in that village
 Tasmate (Mota), a village on the island of Mota  []
 Tesmet (Merelava) (form taken by the name Tasmate in the local Mwerlap language), a village on the island of Merelava  []